Mufti is plain or ordinary clothes, especially when worn by one who normally wears, or has long worn, a military or other uniform, such as a school uniform. It is also called civies and civvies (slang for "civilian attire").

Origins

The word originates from the Arabic "Mufti" (مفتي), meaning an Islamic scholar. It has been used by the British Army since 1816 and is thought to derive from the vaguely Eastern style dressing gowns and tasselled caps worn by off-duty officers in the early 19th century. Yule and Burnell's Hobson-Jobson (1886) notes that the word was "perhaps originally applied to the attire of dressing-gown, smoking-cap, and slippers, which was like the Oriental dress of the Mufti".

Mufti day
A "mufti day" (also known as "casual clothes day", "casual Friday", "colour day", "own-clothes day", "home-clothes day", "plain-clothes day", "non-uniform day", "free-dress day", "civvies day", "dress-down day", and "uniform-free day") is a day where students attend school in casual clothing instead of school uniform. The term is commonly used in many countries where students are required to wear uniform, including the United Kingdom, Ireland, Canada, Fiji, Australia, India, New Zealand, Nigeria, Zimbabwe, Pakistan and Bangladesh. However, one school in New Zealand dropped the term because New Zealand's Human Rights Commission claimed that use of the word to mean non-uniform dress represents an "appropriation" and that the "appropriation has a history of degradation and racism."

By extension, the term is used in reference to the practice of wearing "smart casual" attire to the office instead of business suits or other conventional clothing. Australia takes this even further, where even if a suit or smart-casual attire is the norm, "Mufti Fridays" allow employees to wear jeans, a polo shirt or even a t-shirt.

See also
Demob suit

References

External links
Mufti Day Definition (Archived 2009-11-01)

Indian clothing
English-language idioms